Dr Anna Batchelor is a British consultant physician, best known for her work in intensive care medical education. She was the first female Dean of the Faculty of Intensive Care Medicine between 2013 and 2016 and President of the Intensive Care Society from 2005 to 2007.

Biography 
Batchelor studied medicine at the University of Sheffield and qualified as a doctor in 1980. Training in intensive care medicine and anaesthesia followed in Sheffield, Leicester and Newcastle and she has been a consultant since 1993. Batchelor has led curriculum developments in intensive care medicine and anaesthesia.

Batchelor is the current Chair of the Critical Care Leadership Forum and has been a member of Council for the Royal College of Anaesthetists since 2008.

References 

Living people
Year of birth missing (living people)
Alumni of the University of Sheffield
Intensive care medicine
British women medical doctors
Fellows of the Royal College of Anaesthetists
Women anesthesiologists
21st-century British medical doctors
21st-century women physicians